Pyracantha crenulata, the Nepalese firethorn, Nepal firethorn or Himalayan firethorn, is a species of firethorn. It is cultivated as an ornamental plant. The leaves are used to make herbal tea. The wood can be used to make walking sticks. The pome fruit is orange-red and are food for birds. It is locally named as Ghingharu(घिंगारू) in Kumaon region of Uttarakhand, India.

Gallery

References and external links

 info from Plants for a Future
 info from Encyclopædia Britannica

crenulata
Flora of Myanmar
Flora of China
Flora of the Indian subcontinent
Flora of Tibet